Jana Brejchová (born 20 January 1940) is a Czech film actress. She has appeared in more than 70 films since 1953. She was married to director Miloš Forman and later actor Vlastimil Brodský. Her younger sister Hana is also an actress who has appeared in the Miloš Forman films Loves of a Blonde and Amadeus.

Selected filmography
 Wolf Trap (1957)
 Desire (1958)
 Suburban Romance (1958)
 Higher Principle (1960)
 The Fabulous Baron Munchausen (1961)
 Gripsholm Castle (1963)
 The House in Karp Lane (1965)
 The Pipes (1966)
 The Return of the Prodigal Son (1966)
 End of a Priest (1969)
 Noc na Karlštejně (1974)
 The Young Man and Moby Dick (1979)
 Scalpel, Please (1985)
 The Conception of My Younger Brother (2000)
 Beauty in Trouble (2006)

References

External links

1940 births
Living people
Actresses from Prague
Czech film actresses
20th-century Czech actresses
21st-century Czech actresses
Recipients of Medal of Merit (Czech Republic)
Best Actress German Film Award winners
Czech Lion Awards winners